Linda St. Clair (born 1952 and died on October 14, 2018) was an American contemporary wildlife painter. She was best known for her portrayal of vibrant roosters, cows, and other barnyard, domestic and wild animals. Her work has been acclaimed for its ability to capture an animal's attitude and personality. Themes of pride, love and motherhood are found in her works.

Career
Influenced by artists of the Southwest, St. Clair began exploring a greater variety of approaches in her own work. She began using looser brush strokes and bolder colors to convey the illusion of detail and a more contemporary perspective than earlier works.

She was a two-time recipient of the Grumbacher Gold Medal and her art has earned a place in the permanent collection of the Leigh Yawkey Woodson Art Museum in Wausau, Wisconsin and University of Texas at Austin.

References

External links 
 .  No longer an active link.

1952 births
Living people
20th-century American painters
21st-century American painters
Artists from Santa Fe, New Mexico
American women painters
20th-century American women artists
21st-century American women artists